The Volkspark Mariendorf is a park located in the Mariendorf part of Berlin's borough Tempelhof-Schöneberg, and was built in 1924.  It covers approximately 13 hectares. The landscape architect was Ernst A. Harrich.

Overview
There is a small hill, a well with bronze child figures and 3 lakes (Eckernpfuhl, Bluehmelteich, Karpfenpfuhl). In summer there is a rose garden. The "Volksparkstadion Berlin" (capacity 10,000 spectators), mainly used for soccer matches, is the seventh-largest stadium in Berlin, home to the "Mariendorfer Sportverein 06". In the vicinity there is also a hockey ground and a public swimming pool.

An annual attraction in the park is the "Internationaler Kulturlustgarten" around Ascension Day, featuring numerous cultural events, which attract thousands of visitors from all over Berlin and from the surrounding countryside. Also held yearly is the "Rocktreff", the largest amateur rock band competition in Berlin, taking place in the Volksparkstadion.

Parks in Berlin
Tempelhof-Schöneberg